An albarrana tower is a defensive tower detached from the curtain wall and connected to it by a bridge or an arcade. They were built by Muslims when they occupied the Iberian Peninsula between the 8th and the 15th centuries, especially from the 12th century during the Almohad dynasty and mainly in the south of Spain and Portugal where the Islamic influence was the longest. In Spanish, they are called torre albarrana.

Background
The towers of typical appearance, with a square section, were built several meters in front of the curtain wall. They were accessible by a bridge walkway from the curtain wall. More often, the bridge had a removable wooden section allowing the tower to be isolated from the wall if the tower is occupied by attacking forces. The earliest Albarrana towers were often pentagonal or octagonal in plan (e.g. Badajoz, Tarifa, Seville) but a more rectangular plan became the norm. 

In France and the north of Europe, flanking towers remained a part of the wall. Even the keep was sometimes built as a part of the wall instead of inside the yard at the center of the castle. They were Philippian towers.

The main albarrana towers are :
 Torre de Espantaperros in Badajoz, Spain. Probably the first albarrana tower, built by Abu Yaqub Yusuf in 1170. Its plan is octagonal.
 Torre del Oro, Torre de la Plata in Sevilla
 Torre de la Malmuerta in Cordoba
 Town of Talavera de la Reina near Toledo with several albarrana towers
 Òdena castle near Barcelona
 Castle of Paderne in Portugal
 2 albarrana towers in the Santa Catalina castle in Jaén
 Castle of Loulé in Portugal

Albarrana towers are almost uniquely confined in the Iberian Peninsula. In the other parts of the medieval Muslim world this defensive feature seems not to be used.  However, a notable example can be found in the Citadel of Aleppo, in Syria.

Possibly the only example of a true Albarrana tower in England can be found at Pontefract Castle. The castle now lies in ruins, but one Albarrana tower called Swillington Tower is visible on the models of the castle and the remains of the tower itself can be seen to the north of the castle.

Gallery

References

Further reading

External links
 
  www.elperiodicoextremadura.com elperiodicoextremadura.com 
 castlesofspain.co.uk

Castle architecture
Moorish architecture of the Iberian peninsula
Arabic fortifications